Mason Blanchard Thomas (December 16, 1866 – March 6, 1912) was an American phytopathologist, botanist, professor of both those subjects, and football coach. He was the sixth head football coach at Wabash College in Crawfordsville, Indiana, serving for one season, in 1891, and compiling a record of 1–3.

Head coaching record

Authored bibliography

 . Download and torrent at Archive.org

References

External links
 

1866 births
1912 deaths
Wabash Little Giants football coaches
Cornell University alumni
American phytopathologists
19th-century American botanists
20th-century American botanists